Gustav Larsson (8 March 1914 - 1973) was the second on the Åredalens CK curling team (from Åre, Sweden) during the World Curling Championships (known as the Scotch Cup) 1963 and 1964.

In 1966 he was inducted into the Swedish Curling Hall of Fame.

References

External links
 

1914 births
1973 deaths
Swedish male curlers
Swedish curling champions